The West Midlands Regiment was a short-lived British Territorial Army regiment from 1999 until it was re-designated as 4th Battalion, Mercian Regiment, in 2007.

History
The regiment was formed in 1999 by the amalgamation of three territorial infantry battalions: 5th Battalion, Royal Regiment of Fusiliers; 5th Battalion, The Light Infantry; and 3rd Battalion, Staffordshire Regiment.

The regiment was composed of a headquarters company and five rifle companies, continuing to use the insignia of the regular regiments to which they were affiliated. Its initial structure was as follows:
HQ Company, at Wolverhampton
A (Fusilier) Company, at Sheldon and Coventry(from HQ and B Companies, 5th Battalion, Royal Regiment of Fusiliers)
B (Worcestershire and Sherwood Foresters Regiment) Company, at Kidderminster and Worcester(from A Company, 5th Battalion, The Light Infantry)
C (Staffords) Company, at Burton upon Trent(from C Company, 3rd Battalion, Staffordshire Regiment)
D (Staffords) Company, at Stoke-on-Trent(from B Company, 3rd Battalion, Staffordshire Regiment)
E (Light Infantry) Company, at Shrewsbury and Hereford(from HQ and C Companies, 5th Battalion, Light Infantry)

Structure prior to re-designation
Not long prior to re-designation of a battalion of the Mercian Regiment, the regiment absorbed the companies from other regiments that were within the new regiment's recruiting area, in order to ease the re-designation process. After this, its structure was as follows:
HQ Company, at Wolverhampton
A (Cheshire) Company, at Warrington and Stockport(from B (Cheshire) Regiment, King's and Cheshire Regiment)
B Company, at Crewe and Stoke-on-Trent(from D (Cheshire) Company, King's and Cheshire Regiment)
C (Worcestershire and Sherwood Foresters Regiment) Company, at Mansfield(from C (Stafford) Company, West Midlands Regiment; and D (Nottinghamshire and Derbyshire (Worcestershire and Sherwood Foresters Regiment)) Company, East of England Regiment)
D (Staffordshire) Company, at Wolverhampton, Kidderminster, and Burton upon Trent(from D (Stafford) Company; and Platoon of B (Worcestershire and Sherwood Foresters Regiment) Company)
F (Fusilier) Company, at Birmingham(from A (Fusilier) Company)
L Company (Light Infantry), at Shrewsbury(from E (Light Infantry) Company, less Hereford Platoon to B (Shropshire Yeomanry) Squadron, Royal Mercian and Lancastrian Yeomanry)

4th Battalion, Mercian Regiment
On 1 September 2007, the regiment was re-designated as the 4th Battalion of the Mercian Regiment. It now serves as the reserve infantry battalion for Cheshire, Staffordshire, Worcestershire, West Midlands, Derbyshire, and Nottinghamshire.

Current Structure
Its current structure is as follows:
Headquarters Company, at Wolseley House, Wolverhampton
Rifle Platoon, at Dancox House, Worcester
Javelin Platoon, at Kidderminster
Band of the Mercian Regiment
B Company, at Ubique Barracks, Widnes
Rifle Platoon, in Ellesmere Port
Mortar Platoon, in Stockport
C Company, at Nottingham
Assault Pioneer Platoon, at Mansfield
D (Staffords) Company, at Stoke-on-Trent
Machine Gun Platoon, at Burton upon Trent

References

Wolverhampton
Infantry regiments of the British Army
Military units and formations established in 1998
Military units and formations disestablished in 2007
Mercian Regiment